The Prince Amr Ibrahim Palace is a historical building in Cairo's Zamalek island, which is used as the Egypt's first ceramics museum, the Museum of Islamic Ceramics and as an art center.

History and location
The palace is located in the Gezira area, an island in the Nile, of Zamalek in Cairo. It was built on the orders of Prince Amr Ibrahim (1903–1977), member of the Muhammad Ali dynasty, in 1921. Prince Amr Ibrahim was the husband of Necla Sultan, granddaughter of Ottoman ruler Mehmed VI, also known as Vahideddin. The architect of the building was Garo Balyan, the youngest member of the Balyan family. The cost of the construction was about 200 million euros ($257 million).

The palace was used by Prince Amr Ibrahim and his wife, Necla Sultan, as a summer residence.

Style and layout
The architectural style of the palace is neo-Ottoman and neo-Islamic. It also reflects dominant styles of the Muhammad Ali dynasty in terms of its architectural and decorative style. There are also Moroccan and Andalusian influences in the architecture of the palace.

Total area of the building is 850 square meters. It is made of a basement and two floors. In the entrance hall there is a marble fountain decorated with blue ceramics. The palace is surrounded by a 2,800 square meter garden.

Use
The palace became a state property on 9 November 1953 following the 1952 coup d'etat in Egypt. It was first employed as a club by the Arab Socialist Union until 1971. From 1971 the building was employed by the Ministry of Culture as an exhibition gallery for paintings endowed by former Prime Minister Mohammed Mahmoud Khalil.

In 1998 the building was renovated by the Egyptian architect Aly Raafat and became home to the Museum of Islamic Ceramics in February 1999. As of January 2019 it was closed for restoration for at least 2 years.

References

External links
 Art Center
 Trip Advisor site 

1920s architecture
1921 establishments in Egypt
1999 establishments in Egypt
Art museums and galleries in Egypt
Ceramics museums
Gezira Island
History museums in Egypt
Houses completed in 1921
Museums established in 1999
Museums in Cairo
Palaces in Cairo
20th-century architecture in Egypt